Abdus Sobur is a Bangladeshi art director and actor. He won Bangladesh National Film Award for Best Art Direction five times for the films Aradhana (1979), Surjogrohon (1986), The Affliction of Estrangement (1989), Surjogrohon (1990), Ghatak (1994).

Selected films

As actor
 Jibon Nouka - 1981

As art director

Awards and nominations
National Film Awards

References

External links
 

Bangladeshi art directors
Best Art Direction National Film Award (Bangladesh) winners
Bangladeshi actors
Living people
Year of birth missing (living people)